Espoo United was a Finnish semi-professional ice hockey team that played in the Mestis. The team was formed by Jussi Salonoja after the Espoo Blues went bankrupt in 2016. United went bankrupt themselves after the 2017–18 season.

Honours

Mestis
 Mestis (1): 2017

Final roster 
Updated October 7, 2016

|}

Team Officials
Updated October 7, 2016

References

External links

Sport in Espoo
Mestis teams
Defunct ice hockey teams in Europe